John Sydney Haines AM (26 January 193722 August 2009) was an Australian boat builder and racer, founder of Haines Hunter boats in the 1960s and The Haines Group in 1984.  The Haines Group manufactured thousands of Signature fiberglass trailer-boats using John's cutting edge designs and worldwide patented Signature Variable Deadrise Hull.  Haines also raced his boats, winning many powerboat races and several state and national titles.

References

External links 
 Marine Business World Article
 2004 Honours List
 

1937 births
2009 deaths
Boat builders
20th-century Australian businesspeople